Konstantinos Koulierakis (born 28 November 2003) is a Greek professional footballer who plays as a centre-back for Super League  club PAOK.

Career

Early career
Konstantinos Koulierakis arrived from Chania in 2017 as a speedy, left-footed defender, with very good finishing, especially from long distances, and excellent physicality. He is constantly evolving and is prudent and grounded. He is international, a champion with the U17, he was promoted early to the U19, with which he was also crowned champion, while he had and has participated in a few training sessions of the A' team.

References

2003 births
Living people
Greek footballers
Greece international footballers
Greece youth international footballers
Super League Greece 2 players
Super League Greece players
PAOK FC players
Association football defenders
Footballers from Chania
PAOK FC B players